The Trip is a 1967 American psychedelic film released by American International Pictures, directed by Roger Corman, written by Jack Nicholson, and shot on location in and around Los Angeles, including on top of Kirkwood in Laurel Canyon, the Hollywood Hills, and near Big Sur, California in 1967. Peter Fonda stars as a young television commercial director named Paul Groves.

Plot
Paul Groves, a television commercial director, takes his first dose of LSD while experiencing the heartbreak and ambivalence of divorce from his beautiful but adulterous wife. He starts his trip with a "guide", John, but runs away and abandons him out of fear.

Experiencing repetitive visions of pursuit by dark hooded figures mounted on black horses, Paul sees himself running across a beach.

As Paul experiences his trip, he wanders around the Sunset Strip, into nightclubs, and the homes of strangers and acquaintances. Paul considers the roles played by commercialism, sex, and women in his life. He meets a young woman, Glenn, who is interested in people who take LSD. Having learned from Paul recently that he would be taking LSD, she has been looking out for him. Max is another friendly guide to his trip.

Glenn drives Paul to her Malibu beach house, where they make love, interspersed in his mind with a kaleidoscopic riot of abstract images intercut with visions of pursuit on a beach. Driven into the surf by his pursuers, Paul turns and faces them, and they reveal themselves to be his wife and Glenn. 

As the sun rises, Paul returns to his normal state of consciousness, now transformed by the trip, and steps out to the balcony to get some fresh air. Glenn asks him whether his first LSD experience was constructive. Paul defers his answer to "tomorrow".

Cast

Peter Fonda as Paul Groves
Susan Strasberg as Sally Groves
Bruce Dern as John
Dennis Hopper as Max
Salli Sachse as Glenn
Barboura Morris as Flo
Judy Lang as Nadine
Luana Anders as Waitress
Dick Miller as Cash
Caren Bernsen as Alexandra
Katherine Walsh as Lulu
Barbara Ransom as Barbara
Michael Blodgett as Sally's Lover
Tom Signorelli as Al
Mitzi Hoag as Al's Wife
Uncredited:
Angelo Rossitto as Dwarf in Forest Fantasy
Susan Walters as Go-Go Girl
Frankie Smith as Go-Go Girl
Peter Bogdanovich as Paul's Cameraman
Brandon De Wilde as Paul's Assistant Director
Gram Parsons as Band member

Production

Roger Corman wildly edited some scenes for The Trip, particularly the exterior night scenes on the Sunset Strip, to simulate the LSD user's racing mind. The Trip features photographic effects, body paint on seminude actresses to lend atmosphere, and colorful patterned lighting, during sex scenes and in a club, which imitates LSD-induced hallucinations. Finally, Corman included inscrutable fantasy sequences including one where Fonda is faced with revolving pictures of Che Guevara, Sophia Loren and Khalil Gibran in a wildly lit room. For no apparent reason, a little person riding a merry-go-round in the background blurts  "Bay of Pigs!!"  The story plays over a musical backdrop of improvisational jazz, blues rock by the band The Electric Flag, and an exotic musical score with an organ and horn-drenched theme. 

Corman did research by taking LSD himself. Charles B. Griffith wrote the first two drafts of the script; the first one was about the social issues of the sixties; the second one was an opera. Corman then hired Jack Nicholson to write the eventual screenplay. Corman encouraged Nicholson's experimental writing style and gives between 80 and 90% credit to Nicholson for the shooting script in the director's commentary. Corman slightly modified the story to stay within budget. 

On using Nicholson as a screenwriter Corman said, "I hired him because I knew he was a very good writer. He had written several scripts before. His career wasn’t really doing that much at that time. I knew he had experience with LSD, so I hired him as a writer. I was thinking of possibly using Jack for the role that Bruce Dern played. But I wanted to repeat some of the casting, particularly Peter Fonda and Bruce Dern from The Wild Angels, so I went with Bruce for that reason."

Whilst most of the music actually used in the film was by Mike Bloomfield's Electric Flag, the early visuals (e.g. the band in the club at the start of the film) are of Gram Parsons and the International Submarine Band, one of the earliest country-rock bands. It had been Fonda's original intention for ISB music on the soundtrack, which resulted in ISB recording the song Lazy Days to be used in the film. However, Corman felt the song was insufficiently psychedelic or trippy enough to warrant inclusion, and the Bloomfield/Buddy Miles/Nick Gravenites Electric Flag is what is actually heard in the film.

Salli Sachse recalled working on the film:
Roger was a very linear director–everything went from A to B to C. He was very serious. You didn't goof off or kick back while working with him. You had to be very on-task. It was a stricter atmosphere than I was used to. Roger felt that there had to be a distinction between Susan Strasberg's character and mine, so he wanted me to appear as a blonde... The Trip didn't deserve all the bad press it received. There was no drug use going on during filming–it was strictly professional. Maybe after hours, but I couldn't talk for anybody else.

Release

Released on 23 August 1967 during the "Summer of Love", the film had a huge cultural impact and grossed $6 million against a budget of $100,000. Corman commented on the popularity of the film, "I think that one of the reasons that the audience came in such large numbers was out of curiosity. They didn’t really want to take LSD, but the reviews and comments said this came somewhat close to an LSD experience, so they could take it without taking it".

The film encountered censorship problems in the UK and was refused a certificate four times by the BBFC. A cinema classification was rejected in 1967, 1971 and 1980 and again for video in 1988. It was released on DVD fully uncut in 2004.

The movie holds a 39% "Rotten" score on Rotten Tomatoes based on 23 critics with the consensus: "The Trips groovy effects and compelling message can't overcome the rough acting, long meandering stretches, and pedestrian plot."

Reception
Bosley Crowther of The New York Times wrote, "Is this a psychedelic experience? Is this what it's like to take a trip? If it is, then it's all a big put-on. Or is this simply making a show with adroitly staged fantasy episodes and good color photography effects? In my estimation, it is the latter. And I would warn you that all you are likely to take away from the Rivoli or the 72d Street Playhouse, where the picture opened yesterday, is a painful case of eye-strain and perhaps a detached retina."

Time magazine wrote, "The Trip is a psychedelic tour through the bent mind of Peter Fonda, which is evidently full of old movies. In a flurry of flesh, mattresses, flashing lights and kaleidoscopic patterns, an alert viewer will spot some fancy business from such classics as The Seventh Seal, Lawrence of Arabia, even The Wizard of Oz... The photographer's camera work is bright enough, and full of tricks, without beginning to suggest the heightened inner awareness so frequently claimed by those who use the drug."

Gene Youngblood of Los Angeles Free Press wrote, "Corman’s film is not fine art; more precisely, it’s not refined art. But it is possibly the purest cinematic exercise ever to come out of Hollywood. Here, for the first time to my knowledge, Hollywood gives us a truly cinematic experience: a visual film, structured literally of pictures that move; a montage that is brisk and relatively arbitrary; a storyline that is appreciably abstract, and, most important, a film that pays tribute to the power of the image over the word — this from an industry in which most movies are merely photographed radio scripts."

Box office
The movie was very popular: Corman says it took $6 million in rentals. According to Variety, $5.1 million was in North America.

Samuel Z. Arkoff said American International Pictures (AIP) stopped making "dope pictures" soon after The Trip because he sensed the cycle would exhaust itself quickly. In 1974 he said "everybody else picked it up; and as late as last year they were still coming out with dope pictures. And there isn't one single company that made a buck on dope pictures. The young people had turned off."

Home media
The Trip was released in a Region 1 DVD by MGM on April 15, 2003 as part of their Midnite Movies series doubled with a similar film, Psych-Out, on a double-sided disc.

In 2015, the MGMHD channel broadcast a newly-constructed "Director's Cut" of the film, which removed the opening disclaimer and the "shattered glass" ending imposed by AIP, as well as restoring additional footage to the opening party scene and exit music previously clipped on home video releases. This alternate version was later released on Blu-ray in Region B by Signal One films that year, and on Region A Blu-ray by Olive Films in 2016. The Signal One Blu-ray retained special features created for the previous MGM DVD, including a Roger Corman commentary track, and offered the AIP-mandated scenes (with Corman commentary) as bonus material. The Olive Blu-ray did not port any of the special features, but did include the original trailer.

See also
List of American films of 1967
 List of films featuring hallucinogens

References

External links
 
 
 
 

1967 films
Films about hallucinogens
1960s English-language films
American International Pictures films
1960s exploitation films
Films directed by Roger Corman
Films set in Los Angeles
Hippie films
Films with screenplays by Jack Nicholson
Films produced by Roger Corman
Psychedelic films
Surrealist films
Films shot in Los Angeles